Maa Alludu Very Good is a 2003 Telugu-language comedy film, produced by M.Ramalinga Raju on Roja Movies banner and directed by E. V. V. Satyanarayana. Starring Rajendra Prasad, Allari Naresh, Ramya Krishna, Mounika  and music composed by M. M. Keeravani. The film recorded as a super hit at the box office.

Plot
Parasuram is a petty thief, AV Rao, a multimillionaire and the owner of Coco-Cola Company. A.V.Rao always have bitter experiences with Parasuram whenever they meet which develops into enmity. Once Parasuram sees a girl Meghana while robbing in a hostel and falls in love with her. He steals her diary and while studying it he learns that she has several conditions to select her fiancé such as he should speak in various languages, a well-educated sincere Police officer. Parusuram impresses Meghana by feigning that he has all the qualities what she likes.

The twist is, Meghana is none other than the daughter of A.V. Rao, who is a widower since his age is just 40 his mother wants to make remarriage to him which he doesn't agree. But he falls in love when he sees a lady bachelor Prabhavathi his Personal Secretary, to gain her love he lies that he is also a bachelor and proposes to her which she also accepts.

Meanwhile, A.V. Rao learns that his daughter is in love with Parasuram, he brings the real identity of Parasuram before Meghana that he is a notorious thief. So, Meghana refuses his love. Now Parasuram wants to take revenge against A.V. Rao, he also reveals the truth before Prabhavati that he is a widower and has an 18-year-old daughter. So Prabhavathi also rejects A.V. Rao. The remaining story is how the two pairs patch up with each other.

Cast

Rajendra Prasad as A.V.Rao
Allari Naresh as Parasuram
Ramya Krishna as Prabhavathi
Mounika as Meghana
Brahmanandam as Variety Pullaiah
Kovai Sarala as A.V.Rao's mother
M. S. Narayana as Dental Doctor 
Mallikarjuna Rao as Driver
Chalapathi Rao as Prabhavathi's father 
L. B. Sriram
Kondavalasa as C.I. Vishnu Mani 
Lakshmipathi as Watchman
Krishna Bhagawan 
Raghu Babu
Rami Reddy as Annaseth
Ganesh as Watchman
Surya 
Brahmaji as Brahmaji
Allari Subhashini as Hostel Warden
Karate Kalyani
Ramya Sri
Fish Venkat

Soundtrack

Music composed by M. M. Keeravani. Lyrics written by Chandrabose. Music released on Aditya Music Company.

External links

References

Films directed by E. V. V. Satyanarayana
Films scored by M. M. Keeravani